Susri Dam, also known as Mahavir Bandhara (Mahavir Levee), is located around  north of Shahada, Nandurbar district in the state of Maharashtra, India. Susri Dam is a Diversion dam.

Susri River is affluent of Gomai River. Both rivers originate in the Satpura Mountain Range. Around 10 years ago Engineers built a Levee to block the path of the water of the Susri river. Water in the Susri dam is used for irrigation.

Susri dam (Mahavir bandhara) office is built on the bank of Gomai river just around 50 metres away from Mahavir sculpture in Pandav Leni Complex.

References

Dams in Nandurbar district
Year of establishment missing